Elements is the third studio album released by American technical death metal band Atheist. It was released on August 30, 1993 by Music for Nations in Europe and by Metal Blade Records in the US. Elements was reissued by Relapse Records in 2005 and was digitally remastered with the addition of six bonus tracks.

Eduardo Rivadavia described the album for Allmusic as remaining "admirably true to the band's famously complicated arrangements, syncopated rhythms, and ultra-precise attack, but also boast[ing] a cleaner musicality never before attempted by the group". Elements was written, recorded and mixed in forty days in Pro Media Studios. The band wanted to dissolve but they were required to finish their third album in order to fulfill a contract to their record label. Elements features the addition of a third guitarist, Frank Emmi. Initially, Rand Burkey was not going to appear on the album, and as Kelly Shaefer had developed carpal tunnel syndrome, (preventing him from playing anything but rhythm guitar) a new lead guitar player was needed. Before recording, Burkey rejoined the band, and thus the band ended up with three guitarists. Shaefer plays rhythm guitar, while Emmi and Burkey share responsibilities for leads and solos.

Elements was Atheist's last studio album for 17 years, until the 2010 release of Jupiter.

Critical reception

Elements was described by James Hinchcliffe in Terrorizer as "less frantic and jazz-leaning than Unquestionable Presence, and packed with unexpectedly Latin rhythms" that caused the album to "hurtle...to the edge of metal".  Eduardo Rivadavia praised the band for "delivering another highly accomplished set that illustrated both a natural evolution of their sound and served as a worthy final chapter to their all-too-brief and very troubled trajectory".

Track listing

2005 Re-release
In 2005, Relapse Records re-released Elements. This edition was digitally remastered, and features six bonus tracks.

Live BBC Radio Broadcast (1992)

Personnel
 Kelly Shaefer − lead vocals, rhythm guitar
 Rand Burkey − lead guitar
 Frank Emmi − lead guitar
 Tony Choy − bass

Guest musician
 David Smadbeck - piano (track 3)
 Josh Greenbaum − drums, congas (track 3)

Personnel on 2005 re-release bonus live tracks
 Kelly Shaefer - vocals, rhythm guitar
 Rand Burkey - lead guitar
 Darren McFarland - bass
 Steve Flynn - drums

Production
Mark Pinske - producer, engineer, mixing
Atheist - producers
Shawn Camner - engineer
Kelly Shaefer - mixing

References

Atheist (band) albums
1993 albums
Metal Blade Records albums
Relapse Records albums